Vainiūnai (formerly ) is a village in Kėdainiai district municipality, in Kaunas County, in central Lithuania. According to the 2011 census, the village had a population of 14 people. The road Šėta-Nociūnai goes nearby. There is a water tower and a farm.

Demography

References

Villages in Kaunas County
Kėdainiai District Municipality